Niwari is a town, near city of Ghaziabad in Ghaziabad district in the Indian state of Uttar Pradesh.

Geography
It has an average elevation of 215 metres (705 feet).

Demographics
As of the 2001 Census of India, Niwari had a population of 9919. Males constitute 54% of the population and females 46%. Niwari has an average literacy rate of 62%, higher than the national average of 59.5%: male literacy is 69%, and female literacy is 55%. In Niwari, 15% of the population is under 6 years of age.

Schools
 Sanjay Gandhi Inter College, Niwari

Important Links
Ghaziabad District Administration

References

Cities and towns in Ghaziabad district, India